Gordon William Flemyng (7 March 1934 – 12 July 1995) was a Scottish television and film director. He was also a writer and producer. He directed six theatrical features, several television films and numerous episodes of television series, some of which he also wrote and produced.

Career

Flemyng directed episodes of various British TV series, including The Younger Generation, The Saint, The Avengers, The Baron, Crown Court, ITV Playhouse, Target, Screenplay, Take My Wife, Cribb, The Brack Report, One Summer, Wish Me Luck, The Bill, Emmerdale Farm, Bergerac, Taggart, Peak Practice, Lovejoy, Minder and Ellington (also produced).

Flemyng directed two entries in Edgar Wallace Mysteries (US: The Edgar Wallace Mystery Theatre) series of second features  and the two Dalek feature films of the 1960s, Dr. Who and the Daleks (1965) and Daleks' Invasion Earth 2150 A.D. (1966). Flemyng directed a Hollywood film with an all-star cast, The Split, released in 1968, a crime drama with Jim Brown, Ernest Borgnine and Gene Hackman, based on a novel by Donald E. Westlake. He also directed the British war film The Last Grenade (1970). 

His other credits include Saki (miniseries);  (West German miniseries); Philby, Burgess and Maclean (TV); Flight Into Hell; Cloud Waltzing (TV), Marty Abroad (1971 - TV, produced only) and Confessional (1989 - TV, also produced).

Personal life

Flemyng was a native of Glasgow and the father of actor Jason Flemyng. He died in London at the age of 61.

Selected filmography

 Edgar Wallace Mysteries/The Edgar Wallace Mystery Theatre
 Solo for Sparrow (1962)
 Five to One (1963)
 Just for Fun (1963)
 Dr. Who and the Daleks (1965)
 The Baron (1966)
 Mystery Island (1966)
 Daleks' Invasion Earth 2150 A.D. (1966)
 Great Catherine (1968)
 The Split (1968)
 The Last Grenade (1970)
 Flight into Hell (1985)

References

External links
 

1934 births
1995 deaths
Mass media people from Glasgow
Scottish film directors
Scottish television directors
Scottish television producers